Laleh Gun (also Romanized as Lāleh Gūn; also known as Lālgān) is a village in Ahmadabad Rural District, Hasanabad District, Eqlid County, Fars Province, Iran. At the 2006 census, its population was 544, in 130 families.

References 

Populated places in Eqlid County